Banglavision is a Bangladeshi Bengali-language satellite and cable television channel owned by Shamol Bangla Media Limited, commencing official broadcasts on 31 March 2006. Its name is a portmanteau of "bangla" and "television". Banglavision is based in Bir Uttam C.R. Dutta Road in Banglamotor, Dhaka.

History 
Banglavision applied for a broadcasting license on 30 May 2004, which the Bangladesh Telecommunication Regulatory Commission granted them on 31 January 2005. On the same day, Boishakhi Television and Channel 1 have also received their licenses. Banglavision has also received the ability to broadcast internationally. The channel commenced test transmissions on 25 December 2005, and officially began broadcasting on 31 March 2006 with the "Drishti Jure Desh" (দৃষ্টি জুড়ে দেশ) slogan, with its objective to showcase the Bengali culture to audiences.

Banglavision originally broadcast via the Telstar 10 satellite, but later switched to broadcasting using Apstar-7. It later began broadcasting via the Bangabandhu-1 satellite. On 12 March 2012, cable operators in many areas around Bangladesh have imposed a temporary blackout on Banglavision, along with the unrelated Ekushey Television, after both channels have reported on a BNP rally in detail. Banglavision began airing the Kache Ashar Golpo telefilms on 14 February 2014. Banglavision was one of the nine Bangladeshi television channels to sign an agreement with Bdnews24.com to subscribe to a video-based news agency run by children called Prism in May 2016.

Programming
Banglavision's programming is diversified, consisting of drama, news, music, and much more.

List of programming 
 Amar Ami
 Bhodropara
 Bou Dour
 Fifty-Fifty
 Ghorey Bairey
 Gulshan Avenue
 Harkipte
 Jamai Mela
 Kache Ashar Golpo
 Khelowar
 Lucky Thirteen
 Music Club
 Ronger Dunia
 Shunyo Pata

See also
 List of television stations in Bangladesh

References

External links
 

Television channels in Bangladesh
Mass media in Dhaka
Television channels and stations established in 2006
2006 establishments in Bangladesh